Başakşehir is one of the 39 second-level districts in Greater Istanbul, Turkey. The population of Başakşehir is 311,095 as of 2012. It is in the European part of Istanbul.

History 
Former name of the area was Azatlık. The area specialized in providing gunpowder to the Ottoman army. Later a farm was established in place of Azatlık; the farm was known as Resneli farm referring to Resneli Niyazi, a military officer from Resen, North Macedonia (then a part of Ottoman Empire), who was a hero of Young Turk Revolution in 1908. Up to 2009 most of Başakşehir was a quarter in Küçükçekmece district. Then it was declared a district seat.

Geography 
Sazlıdere Dam reservoir is to the northwest and Sea of Marmara is to the south. It is surrounded by other second-level districts of Istanbul, such as Eyüp, Sultangazi, Esenler, Bağcılar, Küçükçekmece, Avcılar, Esenyurt and Arnavutköy. (Istanbul is one of the 30 metropolitan centers in Turkey with more than one municipality within city borders.)
The Europe Motorway  starts at Mahmutbey in Başakşehir, and runs through the district in west direction to Edirne.

Climate 
Başakşehir experiences a relatively cool Mediterranean climate (Csa/Cs) according to both Köppen and Trewartha climate classifications, with cool winters and warm to hot summers. It is in USDA hardiness zone 9a and AHS heat zone 4.

Notable buildings 
 Atatürk Olympic Stadium
 Başakşehir Fatih Terim Stadium

References 

 
Populated places in Istanbul Province
Districts of Istanbul Province